The Embassy of the United States in Oslo is the diplomatic representation of the federal government of the United States to the Kingdom of Norway. A new embassy was put into service in May 2017. The current Embassy is located in Morgedalsvegen 36, near the Makrellbekken Metro Station, in one of the city's western suburbs. Visitors to the embassy are encouraged to use public transport.

Norwegian-American diplomatic history 
With the dissolution of Sweden–Norway in 1905, the US became one of the first countries to establish diplomatic ties with Norway, that same year. During the Nazi German occupation of Norway in World War II, the United States had no diplomatic representation in Oslo, but the separate ambassador to Norway had diplomatic contact with the Norwegian government-in-exile in London. The Embassy was staffed again right after the war.

The relationship between the United States and Norway is characterized by a long history as partners, friends and allies.

Architectural history 

The former embassy chancery on Henrik Ibsens gate in downtown Oslo was designed by Finnish–American architect Eero Saarinen, who also designed the American embassy in London and the Gateway Arch in Saint Louis, Missouri. It was completed in 1959, four years after Saarinen was first selected for the project. The base of the building forms a horizontal triangle with a dark exterior, which lead to poor circulation and offices with abnormal shapes but also gave it a modern appeal and was well-suited for receptions. Physical security measures, including a fence surrounding the chancery, were added after the September 11, 2001 attacks in the U.S.

As of June 2016, some of the windows had the colors corresponding to those of the Rainbow Flag to give recognition to Pride Month.

New chancery 

For several years, a site was searched for to clarify where a future embassy should be located. Locally it was debated whether it was appropriate when it was suggested to build such a large embassy in a former forest area, that would mean that the public were shut out. In December 2005, the Oslo City Council decided with the least possible majority that the embassy should be offered a new embassy area in Huseby Forest, not far from Makrellbekken subway station.

On May 14, 2012, the groundbreaking ceremony for an embassy at the new location was conducted in Oslo. The  project has a particular focus on environmental features and is constructed by Walsh Group of Chicago and the architects/engineers are EYP Architecture & Engineering.

The new embassy meets stricter requirements for security for US embassy buildings. It opened on May 15, 2017. The embassy at Makrellbekken in Oslo has achieved LEED Gold certification (Leadership in Energy and Environmental Design) for its numerous green elements. The embassy’s environmental features includes the restoration of a seasonal stream that runs through the site, green roofs, preservation of existing landscape, maximized use of natural light and a ground-source heat exchange.

Embassy sections
Consular Section
American Citizen Services
Visa Services
United States Commercial Service
Defense Attaché Office
Foreign Agricultural Service
Public Affairs
Office of Defense Cooperation
Regional Security Office (Diplomatic Security Service)

Trade unions
Embassies in Norway are not required to answer to trade unions of its employees. The embassy does not negotiate with trade unions of its employees.

See also
 United States Ambassador to Norway
 Norway–United States relations
 Embassy of Norway in Washington, D.C.

References

External links
 Official site
 The new embassy at Makrellbekken
 Policy & history Embassy website on the U.S. - Norway relationship
 Norway US department of state
 Travel Advisery, Norway US department of state
 

Oslo
United States
1905 establishments in Norway
Eero Saarinen structures
Norway–United States relations